Paparua is a rural area west of Christchurch city. It contains both Christchurch Men's Prison (often called Paparua Prison) and Christchurch Women's Prison. Quarries and heavy industry dominate in the north of the area. Mike Pero Motorsport Park is on the eastern side.

Paparua County was formed in 1911. It amalgamated with Halswell County in 1968, and was abolished in the 1989 New Zealand local government reforms with its territory divided between Christchurch City and Selwyn District. 

The western boundary of Paparua Statistical Area (Chattertons Road and Dawsons Road) forms the boundary between Christchurch and Selwyn.

Demographics

Paparua had a population of 1,002 at the 2018 New Zealand census, an increase of 201 people (25.1%) since the 2013 census, and an increase of 66 people (7.1%) since the 2006 census. There were 114 households. There were 771 males and 228 females, giving a sex ratio of 3.38 males per female. The median age was 35.3 years (compared with 37.4 years nationally), with 63 people (6.3%) aged under 15 years, 300 (29.9%) aged 15 to 29, 582 (58.1%) aged 30 to 64, and 60 (6.0%) aged 65 or older.

Ethnicities were 74.6% European/Pākehā, 27.5% Māori, 5.4% Pacific peoples, 4.2% Asian, and 1.8% other ethnicities (totals add to more than 100% since people could identify with multiple ethnicities).

The proportion of people born overseas was 10.8%, compared with 27.1% nationally.

Although some people objected to giving their religion, 56.3% had no religion, 30.8% were Christian, 1.8% were Hindu, 0.3% were Muslim, 0.6% were Buddhist and 4.8% had other religions.

Of those at least 15 years old, 60 (6.4%) people had a bachelor or higher degree, and 267 (28.4%) people had no formal qualifications. The median income was $8,200, compared with $31,800 nationally. The employment status of those at least 15 was that 219 (23.3%) people were employed full-time, 84 (8.9%) were part-time, and 48 (5.1%) were unemployed.

References

Suburbs of Christchurch
Populated places in Canterbury, New Zealand